Hamilton Ward may refer to:

People
Hamilton Ward Sr. (1829–1898), U.S. Representative and New York State Attorney General
Hamilton Ward Jr. (1871–1932), New York State Attorney General and son of Hamilton Ward, Sr.
Hamilton Ward (brewer) (1834–1914), New Zealand brewer (Ward's Brewery; now part of Lion)
Hamilton Ward (Kenyan politician) (1880–1925), British settler and member of the Legislative Council of Kenya

Constituency
Hamilton Ward (City of Brisbane), an electoral ward of the City of Brisbane